Gregory Burns, MFA, (born 1957) is an American athlete, painter, author, motivational speaker and member of Art of the Olympians. As a competitive swimmer, Burns represented the USA in the 1992, 1996, and 2000 Paralympic Games, winning two gold, two silver and one bronze medal; he has set 5 World records and numerous American records. 
As a contemporary artist, his paintings have been exhibited in over 80 solo exhibitions and group exhibitions in 15 different countries; Burns has conducted 40 Artist-in-Residence programs around the globe. He is the recipient of the United States Sports Academy’s 2016 Sport Artist of the Year award, (painter). 
As an author, Burns has published three books in English and Mandarin. 
As a motivational speaker, Burns has inspired thousands of adults and children while covering a wide range of interests such as sports, arts, motivation, mental wellness, business, culture, and creativity.

Biography

Gregory Burns was born in Washington, D.C. in 1957. His father, Robert J. Burns, served in the diplomatic corps, and as a result he spent 10 years of his childhood abroad. He contracted polio in Jerusalem in 1958, which left him paralyzed from the waist down. At age three, he took to the water to learn to swim. At age six, he began painting lessons while living in Paris. His early schooling took place in France, Germany, Maryland, and the Netherlands. He earned a Bachelor of Arts in Communication Studies with a minor in Fine Art from the University of California, Santa Barbara (1976-1980), and a Master in Painting (MFA) in 1999 from the Royal Melbourne Institute of Technology, Australia.

As a competitive swimmer, Burns represented the USA in the 1992 (Barcelona), 1996 (Atlanta), and 2000 (Sydney) Paralympic Games, winning two gold medals, two silver medals, and one bronze medal. He set 5 world records in Paralympic swimming and numerous national records. Retiring from the Paralympics in 2004, he transitioned into endurance sporting events; Burns completed the 2006  Korea IronMan race and the Singapore Half-IronMan races in 2007, 2010, 2011, and 2012. Burns is also an avid scuba diver, surfer, hiker, hand cyclist and sit-down snow skier.

As a contemporary artist, Burns has been described as an abstract impressionist. Burns conducted postgraduate studies at (1) Cabrillo College, near Santa Cruz, California, studying commercial and fine art (1982-1984), (2) Chung Da University/National Chengchi University, Taipei, Taiwan, studying Chinese painting & calligraphy and history (in Mandarin; 1984-1985), and (3) Royal Melbourne Institute of Technology, Melbourne, Australia, earning a Master of Fine Art in Painting (1998-1999). His paintings have been shown in 80 solo exhibitions plus dozens of group exhibitions in 15 countries. Burns has conducted 40 Artist-in-Residence programs around the globe.  He is the recipient of the United States Sports Academy’s 2016 Sport Artist of the Year award (painter).

As a philanthropist, since 1984, Burns has supported numerous disadvantaged children’s groups and communities throughout Asia and the USA. For several years, the US Embassy sent Burns deep into the fabric of China, Mongolia and Singapore as a Cultural Ambassador to share his uplifting message with thousands of locals. In the spirit of Robin Hood, Burns has endeavored to inspire people with disabilities and children who have experienced trauma or poverty to rise above their limitations. During a charity auction in Beijing, one of Burns' paintings sold for USD $90,000 which was used to build a school in rural China.

As an author, Burns has published three books: Painted Journey (2005) and The Art of Mindfulness (2014) in English, and Color Your Life (2008) in Mandarin.

As a motivational speaker, Burns' topics include the following:

• Beyond Limitations, One Step at a Time:  Going beyond self-imposed limitations.

• The Hero’s Journey:  Referencing Joseph Campbell’s seminal writings on the stages of life.

• Adapting & Balancing Work and Personal Life:  Maintaining a holistic view of one’s personal and professional activities.

• The Artist’s Journey:  Embracing the artist within.

• Disability Awareness:  Embracing disability and diversity.

Burns also conducts arts-based, team-building, and creativity workshops with the following themes:
 
• Visualizing Company Culture through Art:  Hands-on art-making workshop.

• Shared Mind-sets of Great Leaders & Artists:  Identifying 6 critical approaches to business and creativity, which successful Leaders and Artists have in common.

Medals
1992 IX Summer Paralympics, Barcelona
 Men's 100 m Breaststroke SB4, Silver Medal
 Men's 4×50 m Medley Relay S1–6, Bronze Medal
1996 X Summer Paralympics, Atlanta
 Men's 100 m Backstroke S6, Silver Medal
 Men's 4×50 m Freestyle Relay S1–6, Gold Medal
 Men's 4×50 m Medley Relay S1–6, Gold Medal

Records
World Records in Swimming
 1981, Men's 50 m Backstroke, International Stoke Mandeville Games, England
 1992, Men's 100 m Breaststroke SB4 (Time in qualifying heat: 1:44.21), IX Summer Paralympics, Barcelona
 1996, Men's 100 m Backstroke S6 (Time: 1:20.65), X Summer Paralympics, Atlanta
 1996, Men's 4×50 m Freestyle Relay S1–6 (Team Time: 2:38.13), X Summer Paralympics, Atlanta
 1996, Men's 4×50 m Medley Relay S1–6 (Team Time: 2:39.28), X Summer Paralympics, Atlanta
American Records in Swimming
 1977, 5 USA Records, USA Nationals
 1992, Men's 100 m Breaststroke SB4 (Time in qualifying heat: 1:44.21), IX Summer Paralympics, Barcelona
 1996, Men's 50 m Breaststroke SB4 (Time: 47.50), Indianapolis
 1996, Men's 200 m Individual Medley SM6 (Time: 3:19.68), X Summer Paralympics, Atlanta
 1996, Men's 100 m Backstroke S6 (Time: 1:20.65), X Summer Paralympics, Atlanta
 2000, Men's 200 m Backstroke S6 (Time: 2:55.07), Minneapolis
 2000, Men's 4x50 m Freestyle Relay 20 pts. Class (Team Time: 2:52.79), XI Summer Paralympics, Sydney

Bibliography
 Painted Journey, Gregory Burns, Singapore, 2005. 
 Color Your Life (Mandarin), Gregory Burns, Taiwan, 2008.

See also
 International Paralympic Committee 
 Team USA Paralympics
 Paralympic Swimming
 USA Swimming
 IronMan Triathlon
 Half-IronMan
 United States at the 1992 Summer Paralympics
 United States at the 1996 Summer Paralympics
 United States at the 2000 Summer Paralympics

References

External links
 
 Gregory & Angie Burns Journey
 YouTube Videos:  

 

1957 births
Living people
American male backstroke swimmers
American male painters
Paralympic swimmers of the United States
Paralympic gold medalists for the United States
Paralympic silver medalists for the United States
Paralympic bronze medalists for the United States
Swimmers at the 1992 Summer Paralympics
Swimmers at the 1996 Summer Paralympics
Swimmers at the 2000 Summer Paralympics
Medalists at the 1992 Summer Paralympics
Medalists at the 1996 Summer Paralympics
20th-century American painters
21st-century American painters
21st-century American male artists
Swimmers from Washington, D.C.
Painters from Washington, D.C.
Writers from Washington, D.C.
University of California, Santa Barbara alumni
Paralympic medalists in swimming
American male breaststroke swimmers
American male medley swimmers
S6-classified Paralympic swimmers
S7-classified Paralympic swimmers
20th-century American male artists